Ichthyoelephas is a genus of South American freshwater fish from the family Prochilodontidae.

They feed on algae and detritus that are taken off rocks with their fleshy lips. They are commercially important food fish.

Species 
There are two species:

 Ichthyoelephas humeralis (Günther, 1860)
 Ichthyoelephas longirostris (Steindachner, 1879)

References

Prochilodontidae
Fish of South America